Ernest Feleppa is an electrical engineer at the Riverside Research Institute of Biomedicine in New York City. He was named a Fellow of the Institute of Electrical and Electronics Engineers (IEEE) in 2015 for his contributions to ultrasound imaging medical applications.

References 

Fellow Members of the IEEE
Living people
Year of birth missing (living people)
American electrical engineers